{{Infobox media franchise
|title       = Ju-On
|image       = Ju-on_logo.png
|image_size  = 220
|caption     = Franchise logo
|creator     = Takashi Shimizu
|origin      = Katasumi and 4444444444 (1998)
|owner       = Ju-On theatrical films and TV series:NBCUniversal Entertainment JapanJu-On direct-to-video films:Toei VideoThe Grudge:'''Sony Pictures
|books       =
|novels      = 
|comics      = 
|graphic_novels = The Grudge 1.5|magazines   =
|strips      =
|films       = 
|shorts     = 
|tv          = JU-ON: Origins (2020)
|games       =
|rpgs        =
|vgs         = Ju-On: The Grudge (2009)
|radio       =
|soundtracks = 
|music       = 
|otherlabel1 = Pachinko
|otherdata1  = CR Ju-On|footnotes   = 
}}

 is a Japanese horror franchise created by Takashi Shimizu. The franchise began in 1998 with the release of the short films Katasumi and 4444444444. Shimizu attended the Film School of Tokyo, where he studied under Kiyoshi Kurosawa. Kurosawa helped Shimizu shepherd the Ju-On projects to fruition.

The Ju-On films generally revolve around a curse created in a house in Nerima, Tokyo, when Takeo Saeki, convinced that his wife, Kayako, is having an affair with another man, murders her, their son, Toshio, and Toshio's pet cat in a jealous fit of rage. According to Ju-On, when a person dies with a deep and powerful rage, a curse is born. The curse gathers in the place where that person has died or which they frequented, and repeats itself there. The spirits of the deceased haunt the location, potentially killing anyone who encounters the curse by any means, such as entering a cursed house or being in contact with somebody who was already cursed. The curse's manifestation is mainly death, where the victims' bodies may or may not disappear. The following deaths may create more curses and spread them to other locations.

The franchise consists, to date, of thirteen films, including four American-produced films and one streaming television series, alongside various additional media and merchandise products.

History
Shimizu stated in an interview that the inspiration for Ju-On came from his own personal fears as a child, and from a Japanese dance group that would paint their nude bodies white and perform. Shimizu found the performance frightening and decided to "paint [his] ghosts white". He also mentioned that the rise in the number of domestic abuse cases emerging in Japan during production of his previous films gave him ideas about the origins of the story.

The title of the Japanese films translates roughly to "Curse of Grudge", or more abstractly, a curse created due to an individual bearing a grudge against someone or something. The first two films in the series were so-called V-Cinema, or direct-to-video releases, but became surprise hits as the result of favorable word of mouth. Both films were shot in nine days and feature a story that is a variation on the classic haunted house theme, as well as a popular Japanese horror trope, the "vengeful ghost" (onryō). The titular curse, ju-on, is one which takes on a life of its own and seeks new victims. Anyone who encounters a ghost killed by the curse is killed themselves and the curse is able to be spread to other areas.

Under very tight budgetary constraints, Shimizu's films garnered much acclaim from both critics and genre fans for their effective use of limited locations and eerie atmosphere to generate chills. Shimizu was at the same time perfectly willing to show his ghosts onscreen, in contrast to some directors who might choose only to hint at their appearance. Critics noted that Shimizu's minimalist approach to directing and storytelling—a necessary by-product of the production's limited overall resources—allows the films to retain their ability to unnerve viewers. Very few scenes in the movies are graphically bloody, making such scenes more disturbing when they occur.

Following the success of the two direct-to-video films, and the international success of Hideo Nakata's Ring (1998), Kurosawa and Ring screenwriter Hiroshi Takahashi helped Shimizu develop a theatrical Ju-On sequel starring Megumi Okina and Takako Fuji. The film, titled Ju-On: The Grudge, was released on October 18, 2002 to critical acclaim, and was followed by a sequel, Ju-On: The Grudge 2, that was released on August 23, 2003.

The rights to an American film remake of The Grudge were eventually acquired, with Shimizu himself attached to direct and Sarah Michelle Gellar starring. The film was released in 2004 to mixed reviews. The film's box office success would lead it to spawn its own series of American-produced films, including 2006's The Grudge 2 and 2009's The Grudge 3. Both films follow a unique storyline, albeit The Grudge 2 still drawing inspiration from several Japanese films.

In celebration of the tenth anniversary of the franchise, two new sequels, Ju-On: White Ghost and Ju-On: Black Ghost were screen simultaneously in Japanese theaters in 2009. The stories of two films deviate from that of the cursed Saeki family, focusing on two unrelated, but also, ill-fated families.

For the fifteenth anniversary of the Ju-On franchise, a reboot was released in 2014, titled Ju-On: The Beginning of the End. Drawing inspiration from The Grudge 2, The Beginning of the End features a new backstory regarding the curse, while still featuring the Saeki family as an integral part of the plot. The film was followed by a 2015 sequel, Ju-On: The Final Curse, which was promoted as the final film in the series. Both films had no significant input from series creator Shimizu.

A crossover with the Ring franchise, Sadako vs. Kayako, was released on June 18, 2016.

Another installment of the American film series was released on January 3, 2020 to generally negative reviews.Grudge director, Nicolas Pesce, expressed interest in a crossover between the American Grudge and Ring film series, just as was done with 2016's Sadako vs. Kayako. Prior to his film's release, Pesce expressed further interest in a sequel being set in both a different part of the world than America or Japan, and in a different "less contemporary" time period compared to previous films.

A TV series adaptation, titled JU-ON: Origins, was released exclusively on Netflix worldwide on July 3, 2020.

Films

Japanese films
Timeline 1: Original films
 Katasumi and 4444444444 (1998; short films shown within television movie Gakkō no kaidan G)
 V-Cinema - Straight-to-Video Ju-On: The Curse (2000; V-Cinema)
 Ju-On: The Curse 2 (2000; V-Cinema)
 Theatrical Films Ju-On: The Grudge (2002)
 Ju-On: The Grudge 2 (2003)
 Ju-On: Black Ghost/Ju-On: White Ghost (2009) (10th Anniversary Films)

Timeline 2: Reboot series
 Ju-On: The Beginning of the End (2014; reboot of the franchise)
 Ju-On: The Final Curse (2015)

Timeline 3: Crossover
 Sadako vs. Kayako (2016; crossover with the Ring series)

American films

The Grudge Trilogy
 The Grudge (2004)
 The Grudge 2 (2006)
 Tales from the Grudge - Three short films (Hotel, School, House) that were released as part of marketing for the film.
 The Grudge 3 (2009)
Sidequel
 The Grudge (2020)

Box office performance
Japanese films

American films

 TV series JU-ON: Origins is a streaming television series. The series premiered on Netflix on July 3, 2020 and there are a total of 6 episodes.

Literature
Several Ju-On print publications were published by Kadokawa in Japan, and Dark Horse Comics in North America between 2003 and 2015. Every single Ju-On film has received a novel adaptation, except for The Grudge 3.

Novels
In 2003, novelizations of stories from the series were written by Kei Ohishi. The first novel, Ju-on, elaborates on events and characters from Ju-On: The Curse, The Curse 2 and Ju-On: The Grudge. A novel titled Ju-On 2 was released the same year, which elaborates on the events from Ju-On: The Grudge 2. Novelizations of Ju-On: White Ghost and Black Ghost were published in 2009. Ju-On 2, White Ghost and Black Ghost did not receive English translations. In 2014, a novelization of The Beginning of the End was released and a novelization of The Final Curse was released in 2015.

Official Japanese-language novelizations of the American films were also written by Kei Ohishi, the first being a novelization of The Grudge (released in Japan as The Juon), which was published in 2005 and generally follows the premise of the film faithfully. A novelization of its sequel, The Grudge 2 (released in Japan as Ju-On: Pandemic), was published later on in 2007. The novels were all published by Kadokawa Shoten and only the 2003 novel received an English translation.

Video game

In honor of the series' 10th anniversary, a game, titled Ju-On: The Grudge – Haunted House Simulator was developed for the Wii. The game was released in Japan in 2009 by AQ Interactive under the title Kyoufu Taikan: Ju-On (Fear Experience: Ju-On), and in Europe under the title Ju-On: A Fright Simulator. Upon release, the game was critically panned.

Xseed Games described it as a "haunted house simulator", rather than a traditional survival horror game. The game does not feature any combat, as its format relies on subtle exploration and scare tactics. Joystiq reviewers who were present for the demo's screening at the E3 justified this, observing that "in most horror games, a skilled player can actually defeat the creatures (with notable exceptions like Silent Hill 2s Pyramid Head ...), making the game more of a power fantasy than a true fright. In both of these games [Silent Hill 2 and Ju-On: The Grudge''], you can escape the creatures at best".

Notes

References

External links
 
 
 
 
 
 
 
 

 
Film series introduced in 1998
Horror film series
Films about curses
Films adapted into television shows
Horror mass media franchises
Japanese supernatural horror films
Kadokawa Dwango franchises